Rendy Juliansyah (born 27 July 2002) is an Indonesian professional footballer who plays as an attacking midfielder or forward for Liga 1 club Persik Kediri.

Club career

Persik Kediri
On 26 May 2022, he signed a contract with Persik Kediri to play in Liga 1 in the 2022 season. Juliansyah made his league debut on 23 August 2022 in a match against PSS Sleman at the Brawijaya Stadium, Kediri.

International career
Juliansyah was part of the Indonesia U17 team that won the 2018 AFF U-16 Youth Championship and the Indonesia U19 team that finished third in the 2019 AFF U-19 Youth Championship.

Career statistics

Club

Honours

International
Indonesia U16
 Thien Phong Plastic Cup: 2017
 JENESYS Japan-ASEAN U-16 Youth Football Tournament: 2017
 AFF U-16 Youth Championship: 2018
Indonesia U19
 AFF U-19 Youth Championship third place: 2019

References

External links
 Rendy Juliansyah at Soccerway
 Rendy Juliansyah at Liga Indonesia

2002 births
Living people
People from Tangerang
Sportspeople from Banten
Indonesian footballers
Liga 2 (Indonesia) players
Liga 1 (Indonesia) players
RANS Nusantara F.C. players
Persik Kediri players
Indonesia youth international footballers
Association football forwards
Association football midfielders